Edwin H. McConkey is an American biologist. , he is a professor emeritus at the department for Molecular, Cellular, and Developmental Biology at the University of Colorado at Boulder, Colorado.

His contributions to taxonomy include the original description the northern subspecies of mole skink, Plestiodon egregius similis.

Education
Bachelor of Science from the University of Florida in 1949.
Master of Science from the University of Florida in 1951.

Bibliography
(1976) Protein Synthesis: a Series of Advances .
(1993) Human Genetics: The Molecular Revolution (The Jones and Bartlett Series in Biology) .
(2004) How the Human Genome Works .

External links
Molecular, Cellular, and Developmental Biology at Colorado
contact details

University of Florida alumni
People from Boulder, Colorado
Year of birth missing (living people)
Living people
University of Colorado faculty
21st-century American biologists